The St. Lawrence and Hudson Railway  was a wholly owned subsidiary of the Canadian Pacific Railway.

The StL&H arose out of a corporate reorganization at CPR that was announced on November 21, 1995.  CPR wished to spin off its "eastern operating unit" into an operating railway company as a means to control poor financial performance of its assets in eastern North America.

The new wholly owned subsidiary was named the St. Lawrence & Hudson Railway Company Limited and became operational on October 1, 1996, taking control of all CPR assets from Quebec City to Chicago (CPR trackage and trackage rights), and from Montreal to Washington, D.C. (Delaware and Hudson Railway), thus the D&H became a StL&H subsidiary.

The company name reflected its geographic region of operations - the St. Lawrence River valley and the Hudson River valley.

The StL&H was given a dedicated management team and the authorization to undertake radical measures to reverse financial losses.  Within one year the financial picture was reversed and CPR announced its intention to continue ownership of the SL&H assets.

On January 1, 2001, the StL&H assets were transferred back to CPR ownership and the StL&H was dissolved.  The D&H, being the CPR's corporate face in the northeastern United States, remained legally intact.

See also

 List of defunct Canadian railways

External links
 The "Unofficial" St.Lawrence & Hudson Railway Page
 , Railways of Canada 2000

Canadian Pacific Railway subsidiaries
Defunct Ontario railways
Defunct Quebec railways
Defunct Michigan railroads
Defunct New York (state) railroads
Predecessors of the Canadian Pacific Railway
Railway companies established in 1996
Railway companies disestablished in 2001